Sumuvvul Ameer Mohamed Amin Dhoshimeynaa Kilegefaanu (Dhivehi: ސުމުއްވުލް އަމީރު މުހައްމަދު އަމީން ދޮށިމޭނާ ކިލެގެފާނު) (July 20, 1910 – January 19, 1954),  popularly known as Mohamed Amin Didi, was a Maldivian politician. He served as the first president of the Maldives and as the head of government between January 1, 1953, and August 21, 1953. Amin Didi was also the principal of Majeedhiyya School from 1946 to 1953.

Amin Didi was the leader of the first political party in the Maldives, Rayyithunge Muthagaddim Party. His political program included efforts to modernize the country, including the advancement of women, education in the Maldives, nationalising the fish export industry and an unpopular ban on tobacco smoking.

Amin Didi took office during post World War II period, a time when the country was in widespread famine and exhausted resources.

Early life
Amin was the son of Athireegey Ahmed Dhoshimeynaa kilegefaan and Roanugey Aishath Didi. He was a descendant of the Huraa Dynasty, from his father's side. In 1920, he went abroad to Ceylon (now Sri Lanka) and studied in Saint Joseph's College, Colombo. In 1928, he went to India for further studies, returning to the Maldives one year later.His wife was Fathimath Saeed, and his only child was Ameena Mohamed Ameen.

Politics
In 1931, Amin was appointed to the Constituent Assembly convened by Sultan Muhammad Shamsuddeen III to draft the country's first written constitution. He subsequently held various posts in the government, such as the chief officer of Customs, head of the Maldivian Post Office, and Minister of Trade, and Minister of Finance (1942–1952), and was also a member of the First Maldivian Parliament.

With the support of the people, he abolished the 812-year-old sultanate and became the first President of the Maldives on 1 January 1953, although he had always supported a constitutional monarchy.

After the death of Sultan Majeed Didi and his son Prince Hassan Fareed Didi, the members of the parliament elected Amin Didi as the next person in line to succeed the sultan. But Didi is known to have said: "for the sake of the people of Maldives I will not accept the crown and the throne". So, a referendum was held and the Maldives became a republic. But the republic was short lived and a revolution was brought by the people of Male' instigated five persons seeking power, while the President was in Ceylon for medical treatment. A period followed in which parts of the south broke and formed the short-lived United Suvadive Republic instigated by the British who were building a signalling station in Addu.

The people of Male' appointed Velaanaagey Ibrahim Didi, Amin's vice president, as the head of the government. Amin Didi was aware of these events and was warned not to return to the Maldives, but he did on a Catalina. As soon as Amin Didi returned, for his own safety, he was taken to Dhoonidhoo island and was kept there under the government's supervision, but treated in the same manner as a head of state in the Maldives.

Four months after being taken to Dhoonidhoo, secret letters were exchanged between him and Ibrahim Hilmy Didi, to bring an end to the revolutionary government and to restore the monarchy, with Ibrahim Hilmy as the king and Amin Didi as the prime minister. One night Amin Didi arrived in Male and tried to take control of Bandeyrige, enraging the people of Male' so much that he was nearly beaten to death. After that, he was thrown into a small boat (bohkuraa) near Male'.

Later, the leaders of the small rebel group who wanted Mohamed Amin as leader were brought to court, including Mohamed Amin Didi, Ibrahim Hilmy Didi and Shamsuddin Hilmy. These people were sentenced to exile. Mohamed Amin was banished to Kaafu Atoll, Gaafaru, Ibraahim Hilmy was banished to K. Gulhi and Shamsuddin Hilmy was banished to K. Himmafushi.

As the former president's health deteriorated, he was brought to Vihamanaafushi Island (now Kurumbaa village), where he died on 19 January 1954. A small funeral was held there.

The Office of Ombudsperson for Transitional Justice 
The Office of Ombudsperson for Transitional Justice has accepted a case lodged with the office seeking justice for the death of Mohamed Ameen Didi – the first President of Maldives.  

The case was submitted by the Political Appointee to the Ministry of Environment, Climate Change and Technology, Executive Director Mr. Labeeq Mohamed Mahid  in September 2021. 

Labeeq said the case involves loss of fundamental human rights due to systemic abuse by state institutions. He said it needs to be made clearer how the state treated Ameen.  

He also requested to overturn Ameen’s conviction as a traitor.  

Ameen served as President of Maldives for eight months – between January 1953 and August 1953. He was removed from power and banished to Vihamanaafushi Island – now Kurumba Island Resort – where he died in January 1954.  

The Office of Ombudsperson for Transitional Justice is mandated with identifying and investigating systemic human rights violations by state institutions.

Family
Amin Didi had one daughter, Ameena Mohamed Ameen. His grandson Ameen Faisal was the Minister of Defence and National Security of Maldives. His other grandchildren are Ibrahim Faisal, Farahanaz Faisal and Aishath Shuweykar. His mother's name was Aishath Didi his father's name was Ahmed Dhoshimeynaa Kileygefaanu.

Genealogy

References

Further reading

1910 births
1954 deaths
Presidents of the Maldives
Prime Ministers of the Maldives
Finance ministers of the Maldives
Trade ministers of the Maldives
Rayyithunge Muthagaddim Party politicians
Maldivian Muslims
Members of the People's Majlis